Sarab-e Shuhan (also Romanized as Sarāb-e Shūhān) is a village in Homeyl Rural District, Homeyl District, Eslamabad-e Gharb County, Kermanshah Province, Iran. At the 2006 census, its population was 204, in 50 families.

References 

Populated places in Eslamabad-e Gharb County